Tom McWilliam (born 29 May 1967) is an Irish sailor. He competed in the Star event at the 1992 Summer Olympics.

References

External links
 

1967 births
Living people
Irish male sailors (sport)
Olympic sailors of Ireland
Sailors at the 1992 Summer Olympics – Star
Place of birth missing (living people)